Rabai Thermal Power Station is a 90 megawatt heavy fuel oil-fired thermal power station in Kilifi County, Kenya.

Location
The coordinates of the power station are:3°56'02.0"S, 39°33'39.0"E (Latitude:-3.933886; Longitude:39.560825).

Developers and financing
The power station was built using private funds on a build-own-operate model. The developers will own and operate the plant for 25 years from commissioning. The construction costs for the plant were KSh12 billion (approx. US$120 million). The two leading owner-developers are: (a) "Burmeister & Wain Scandinavian Contractor A/S" (BWSC) of Demnmark and (b) "Aldwych International Ltd." (Aldwych) of the United Kingdom.

See also

List of power stations in Kenya
List of power stations in Africa
List of power stations

References

External links
Lamu banks on Sh9 billion Rabai project for power

Heavy fuel oil-fired power stations in Kenya
Power stations in Kenya
Kilifi County